Łuszczów-Kolonia  is a village in the administrative district of Gmina Łęczna, within Łęczna County, Lublin Voivodeship, in eastern Poland.

See also
 Łuszczów-Kolonia, Hrubieszów County
 Łuszczów Pierwszy
 Łuszczów Drugi

References

Villages in Łęczna County